Different Strokes may refer to:

Different Strokes, a novel written by David Leo
Diff'rent Strokes, an American sitcom 
Different Strokes (film), a 1998 erotic film
Different Strokes (Alison Krauss album), 1985
Different Strokes (The Nite-Liters album), 1972
"Different Strokes", a 1967 song by Syl Johnson
Different Strokes, a 2022 video game by Different Folks

See also
"Everyday People", a 1968 song by Sly and the Family Stone
Different Strokes by Different Folks, a 2005 album by Sly and the Family Stone
 Different Strokes for Different Folks, a 1972 album by Don Covay and the Jefferson Lemon Blues Band